Spaceship Earth is a dark ride attraction at the Epcot theme park at the Walt Disney World in Bay Lake, Florida. The geodesic sphere in which the attraction is housed has served as the symbolic structure of Epcot since the park opened in 1982. 

The 15-minute ride takes guests on a time machine-themed experience, demonstrating how advancements in human communication have helped to create the future one step at a time. Riding in Omnimover-type vehicles along a track that spirals up and down the geodesic sphere, passengers are taken through scenes depicting important breakthroughs in communication throughout history—from the development of early language through cave paintings, to the use of hieroglyphs, to the invention of the alphabet, to the creation of the printing press, to today's modern communication advancements, including telecommunication and mass communication. 

Since its 1982 opening, the ride has been updated three times—in 1986, 1994, and 2008. On February 25, 2020, Disney announced that Spaceship Earth would be closing for refurbishment on May 26, 2020. However, its refurbishment is currently placed on indefinite hold due to the COVID-19 pandemic.

Structure

The structure is similar in texture to the United States pavilion from Expo 67 in Montreal but, unlike that structure, Spaceship Earth is a complete sphere, supported by three pairs of legs. The architectural design was conceived by Wallace Floyd Design Group. The structural designs of both Expo 67 and Spaceship Earth were completed by Simpson Gumpertz & Heger Inc. of Boston, Massachusetts.

Geometrically, Spaceship Earth is derived from the Class 2 geodesic polyhedron with frequency of division equal to 8. Each face of the polyhedron is divided into three isosceles triangles to form each point. In theory, there are 11,520 total isosceles triangles forming 3840 points. In reality, some of those triangles are partially or fully nonexistent due to supports and doors; there are actually only 11,324 silvered facets, with 954 partial or full flat triangular panels.

The appearance of being a monolithic sphere is an architectural goal that was achieved through a structural trick. Spaceship Earth is in fact two structural domes. Six legs are supported on pile groups that are driven up to 160 feet into Central Florida's soft earth. Those legs support a steel box-shaped ring at the sphere's perimeter, at about 30 degrees south latitude in earth-terms. The upper structural dome sits on this ring. A grid of trusses inside the ring supports two helical structures of the ride and show system. Below the ring, a second dome is hung from the bottom, completing the spherical shape. The ring and trusses form a table-like structure which separates the upper dome from the lower. Supported by and about three feet off the structural domes is a cladding sphere to which the shiny Alucobond panels and drainage system are mounted.

The cladding was designed so that when it rains, no water pours off the sides onto the ground. All water is collected through one-inch gaps in the facets into a gutter system, and the water is channeled into the World Showcase Lagoon.

History

Design and construction
The structure was designed with the help of science fiction writer Ray Bradbury, who also helped write the original storyline for the attraction. The term "Spaceship Earth" was popularised by Buckminster Fuller, who also popularized the geodesic dome.

Construction took 26 months. Extending upwards from the table are "quadropod" structures, which support smaller beams which form the shell of the steel skeleton. Pipes stand the aluminum skin panels away from the skeleton and provide space for utilities. A small service car is parked in the interstitial space between the structural and cladding surfaces, and it can carry a prone technician down the sides to access repair locations. The shop fabrication of the steel (done in nearby Tampa, Florida) was an early instance of computer-aided drafting and materials processing.

Spaceship Earth was originally sponsored by the Bell System from 1982 until 1984, when it was broken into smaller companies and its parent company, AT&T, became an independent company. AT&T sponsored Spaceship Earth from 1984 until 2004. From 2005 until 2017, the German company Siemens was the sponsor of Spaceship Earth. As of 2021, the ride currently has no sponsor. The private sponsor lounge, located on the second floor above Project Tomorrow, is currently used for special events.

Dedication
During Epcot Center's opening ceremony William Ellinghaus, then president of AT&T, dedicated Spaceship Earth and stated: "Now as you will soon see, Spaceship Earth’s theme is communications, civilization and communications from Stone Age to Information Age, and I therefore think it is very fitting that we dedicate Spaceship Earth to all of the people who have advanced communications, arts, and sciences, and in so doing have demonstrated that communications is truly the beginning of understanding."

Ride updates

From October 1, 1982, to May 25, 1986, the attraction experience began with the ride vehicles moving up into the structure through a lighted tunnel, enhanced by a fog machine, and then ascending on a spiraling track up through dark spaces featuring a series of lighted historic vignettes. The attraction featured actor Vic Perrin as the narrator along with a very simple and quiet orchestral composition throughout. The theme of "communication through the ages" is presented in chronological order in settings peopled with Audio-Animatronics figures. Cavemen are seen telling stories using wall carvings; Egyptians work on hieroglyphics and papyrus as a pharaoh inspects the final result. A Greek theater presents actors declaiming Oedipus Rex. Charioteers carry messages from a Roman court, and Jewish and Islamic scholars discuss texts. With typical Disney whimsy, a monk is seen having fallen asleep on a manuscript he was inscribing. Michelangelo, overhead, paints the ceiling of the Sistine chapel, and Gutenberg mans his printing press. Suggesting the rush of 20th-century technology, subsequent scenes meld together as the circumference of the ride track narrows. A newsboy hawks papers, a movie marquee and film clips represent motion pictures, and radio and television are represented. On the right side of the track, the vehicles then pass a wall with angled windows looking out into the stars, a glass wall with a mainframe computer blinking behind it, and a woman observing technical readouts on various screens. On the left side of the track, a man and a woman are seen working at a network operations center with a data map of the United States. As the vehicles reach the large space at the apex of the ride system, guests see, on the planetarium ceiling of the sphere, a projection of "our spaceship earth", and then they pass under a large lighted space station with two astronauts working on satellites and a woman sitting in the station operating controls. The Omnimover vehicles then revolve 180 degrees and pass under the woman through the station's “hangar”, so that the passengers lie backward facing the "sky" as they begin their descent on a relatively straight track passing various monitors showing various events and activities. The ride stops intermittently as wheelchairs are loaded or unloaded. 

From May 26, 1986, to August 15, 1994, the attraction was given a slight remodel. This second version of the attraction started off with the lighted tunnel enhanced by twinkling lights, meant to depict stars, with the fog machine removed. News journalist Walter Cronkite was the new narrator, reading from an updated script. Two new scenes were added before the network operations center, on the left side of the track, featuring a woman working in a “paperless office” and a boy at a computer in his bedroom (the right side, featuring a woman observing technical read outs, remained the same). A theme song called "Tomorrow's Child" was composed for the ending of the attraction, which was redesigned with projected images of children on screens to fit the theme of "Tomorrow's Child".

From November 23, 1994, to July 9, 2007, the attraction was closed to receive a major remodel. This third version of the attraction kept the lighted tunnel as it was in 1986, and it maintained the majority of the scenes depicted in the beginning and middle of the attraction. Three 1980s scenes toward the end of the attraction were removed: a computer in a boy's bedroom, a woman's office, and a network operations center. These were replaced with a single scene depicting a boy and girl using the Internet to communicate between America and Asia. The ride received an updated script narrated by Jeremy Irons. A new orchestral composition, based upon Bach's Sinfonia No. 2 in C Minor, was composed for the entire attraction. The ending was completely redone, with the updating of the projected Earth and removal of the Space Station scene from the planetarium (the Space Station astronauts subsequently turned up in Space Mountain's post-show, where they were used until 2009) as well as the replacement of the 1982 and 1986 ending scenes with miniature architectural settings that were connected by color-changing fiber-optic cables, and arrays of blinking lights, representing electronic communication pathways.

Wand and update

In celebration of the year 2000, a 25-story "magic wand" held by a representation of Mickey Mouse's hand was built next to the sphere. Inspiration for it came from the Sorcerer's Apprentice sequence of Fantasia (although Mickey did not actually use a magic wand in that sequence). At the top of the structure was a large cut-out of the number 2000. This structure was constructed to have a lifetime of about 10 years, and it was left standing after the Millennium Celebration ended. In 2001, the number 2000 was replaced with the word "Epcot" in a script font that differed from the park's logotype.

On July 5, 2007, Epcot Vice President Jim MacPhee announced that Spaceship Earth would be restored to its original appearance, and that the "magic wand" structure would be removed in time for the park's 25th anniversary on October 1, 2007. It was rumored that Siemens AG, the new sponsor of Spaceship Earth, requested the wand be removed as it did not fit their corporate image. The attraction was closed on July 9, 2007, and by October 1 the wand structure, the stars and their supports were gone, replaced by palm trees and other plants. Components of the structure were later auctioned on eBay.

The closure also saw the ride's fourth update, which included new scenes and modifications to existing scenes, some new costumes, lighting, and props, a new musical score by Bruce Broughton, new narration by Judi Dench, and a new interactive ending. New scenes showed a Greek classroom, mainframe computers and the creation of the personal computer. The attraction opened for "soft launch" previews starting in December 2007. After some last-minute adjustments in January, the ride had its official re-opening on February 15, 2008.

The "time machine" vehicles now have an interactive screen where riders can choose their vision of the future. This resembles a similar idea to the now-defunct Horizons attraction. At the beginning of the ride, a camera takes riders' pictures (using facial recognition technology) which are used at the end of the ride to conduct an interactive experience about the future of technology, featuring the riders' faces on animated characters, with narration by Cam Clarke. Visitors are now also asked where in our Spaceship Earth they live; this is used in the post-show area where a map of the world is displayed with the riders' faces shown where they live.

On June 30, 2017, Siemens, a long-time sponsor, announced they would end their sponsorship of the attraction, as well as the firework show, IllumiNations: Reflections of Earth. The last official day of Siemens sponsorship was on October 10, 2017.

World Celebration update

On August 25, 2019, it was announced that, as part of a multi-year renovation of Epcot, Future World would become three new areas: World Celebration, World Discovery and World Nature. Spaceship Earth (which is under the name of Spaceship Earth: Our Shared Story) would become a part of World Celebration, and would be updated with a new narrative about the human experience and the art of storytelling. An ethereal "story light" would guide guests as they travel through the attraction.

On July 15, 2020, when EPCOT officially reopened, Spaceship Earth: Our Shared Story was postponed. When asked for comment, a spokesperson for Disney said, "As with most businesses during this period, we are further evaluating long-term project plans. The decision was made to postpone development of the 'Mary Poppins'-inspired attraction and Spaceship Earth at this time."

Ride experience
As the ride was built on an omnimover system, there were no triggered ride events. Rather, a narration plays as the show scenes and music run on loop. The script, originally penned by Ray Bradbury, has since been updated to meet contemporary technological trends. The current narrator is Judi Dench, who is accompanied by an orchestral score by Bruce Broughton.

This attraction showcased the first use of the "smellitzer" scent distribution system. It was created by Imagineer Robert 'Bob' McCarthy in 1981 to emulate the faux scent of smoke in the city of Rome scene. The smellitzer was named after the Howitzer cannon as it shoots out puffs of smells. It was patented in 1984 as a Scent-Emitting System and is US patent #US4603030A. This technology was also used on Universe of Energy to create the smell of a volcano and a swamp.

Show scenes

The ride begins with the time-machine vehicles ascending into a dark tunnel with twinkling stars all around. An adventurous orchestral theme starts to play. As the score shifts to the theme ostinato, a leitmotif that comes to represent digital interference. On touchscreens in the vehicle, guests select their language and hometown, and then have their picture taken by a passing camera.

As the vehicle arrives at the first story of the structure, it begins a slow curve. A large film screen is stretched along the inside of the sphere, depicting early humans fighting for survival against a woolly mammoth without a form of communication and language. As the screen dims behind them, guests enter a cavern populated by audio animatronic early humans, who represent the development of early language through cave paintings. The drawings on the walls come to life and begin to dance as the car continues onward.

The score modulates, presenting the theme in a phrygian mode, implying a middle eastern atmosphere. Guests are brought through a heated diorama of the Egyptians, who invented a system of portable communication using hieroglyphs recorded on papyrus, as opposed to cave paintings that were unable to be transported as humans migrated.

Phoenician merchants are seen carrying goods to faraway lands. The narration explains how each civilization is trying to communicate, but cannot understand each other due to the language barrier. But the Phoenicians, who trade with all of them create a simple common alphabet, so that trade and communication becomes easier. Turning a corner, riders see a lesson in mathematics being taught in a piazza in an ancient Greek city, in a sequence that attempts to show how math helped invent the 'birth of a high tech life we enjoy today.' Shifting to ancient Rome, a night scene including a traveler in a chariot delivering news depicts how language is portrayed as a tool for cultural unification with the vast network of roads that stretched across Europe, ultimately all leading to Rome.

Suddenly, the scene takes a dark turn as crashes are heard and the smell of burning wood fills the air. The fall of Rome by invading mercenary armies also brought the destruction of the bulk of the world's recorded knowledge, including the loss of scrolls at the Library of Alexandria. But the narration gives hope as the vehicle reaches the next level, where Jewish and Islamic scholars of the Middle Ages are seen preserving recorded information, and continuing to progress in science.

Winding through exotic fabrics and drapery, guests arrive at a monastery where biblical manuscripts are being copied by hand. The composition shifts to a hallelujah chorus, sung to the melody of the piece's exposition. Gutenberg is seen working the first movable-type printing press, allowing information to travel freely across the globe. The European Renaissance is portrayed, with animatronics of ensembles playing rich, polyphonic secular motets, sculpting a woman, and the painting of a portrait of fruit. The scene ends as the car passes under a scaffold, where Michelangelo is seen painting the ceiling of the Sistine Chapel.

The time machines transition to a post-Civil War North. Guests witness syndicated news reports illuminating the planet of current events with amazing efficiency. Loud, industrial-sized printing presses show the incredible influence of the machine as an advancement in mass communication. As guests pass the clanging sounds of the press, the score's theme is presented again, this time with an uptempo ragtime piano. Seen next is a romanticized version of the 20th century communications revolution—after passing telegraphs, radio, telephones, and movies, riders see the 1969 television broadcast of Apollo 11 landing on the moon, featuring Walter Cronkite. Riders hear Neil Armstrong say his most famous quote, "That's one small step for man, one giant leap for mankind." while the vehicles pass by the TV. Language had progressed to such an extent that it no longer was spoken solely by humans, but by machines as well.

Guests turn a corner and find themselves in a large mainframe computer as they ascend up the final hill. At the top, a slow descent starts, progressing through a garage in California, where a man is seen building one of the first home computers. The score becomes suddenly percussive and dramatic as guests fly through a tunnel with computer code projected onto the walls. At a crescendo, the car makes its final turn into the cupola of Spaceship Earth. The top of the structure is, in fact, a planetarium studded with stars and a large projection of a rotating Earth. Before the omnimover vehicles start to move down the long descent to the unloading area, they rotate 180 degrees clockwise and guests ride the end of the attraction backwards. The final scene has been redone multiple times, most recently to remove the animatronic scenes. 

The remainder of the ride moves past a seemingly infinite number of stars and into a realm of glowing triangles. The guests can then use the touchscreens in their Omnimover vehicle to answer questions to create a possible depiction of their future, which uses the pictures taken at the beginning of the ride.

Guests are then invited to visit Project Tomorrow as they exit the ride cars.

Post-show

Earth Station
The original post show for Spaceship Earth was called Earth Station. It lasted from 1982 until 1994. It was a wide open exhibit space that included:
EPCOT Center Guest Relations
Seven large rear projector screens mounted on the walls of the exhibit space toward the ceiling that displayed visual previews of various EPCOT Center attractions.
WorldKey Information: Interactive kiosks that offered previews of various EPCOT Center attractions. Guests could also talk to a live cast member via two-way closed-circuit video, or make a restaurant reservation while in the park.

Global Neighborhood
When AT&T renewed their sponsorship in 1994, they redesigned the exhibit space for Earth Station into the Global Neighborhood. The original Global Neighborhood lasted from 1994 until 1999. In 1999, the exhibit space was updated to become the New Global Neighborhood for the Millennium Celebration. The exhibit space closed in 2004 after AT&T left as sponsor.

Project Tomorrow: Inventing the Wonders of the Future
AT&T's departure as sponsor in 2004 caused the exhibit to close. Siemens AG, the newest sponsor of Spaceship Earth, having signed on in 2005, created a new exhibit space called Project Tomorrow: Inventing the Wonders of the Future. The new exhibit space once again uses the entire exhibit space that only Earth Station had once used. The new exhibit space houses interactive exhibits featuring various Siemens AG technology. These interactive displays and games allow guests to see the future of medicine, transportation and energy management. The space opened with two games, with two new games added in December 2007 and January 2008. After Siemens dropped their sponsorships, all signs mentioning them were removed, however, the name stayed the same. 

Project Tomorrow current attractions are:
 An illuminated globe that shows the hometown of all Spaceship Earth visitors for the day.
 Body Builder – a 3-D game that challenges guests to reconstruct a human body. Features the voice of Wallace Shawn as Dr. Bones.
 Super Driver – a driving simulation video game featuring vehicle accident and avoidance systems. It simulates what is supposed to be the future of driving. You drive a "smart-car" and try to stop the city from being destroyed.
 Power City – a large, digital "shuffleboard-style" game that has guest racing around the board to power their city.
 InnerVision – a coordination and reaction-time game with elements similar to Simon and Dance Dance Revolution

VIP Lounge
A VIP lounge, operated by the pavilion sponsor, exists above the post-show area of Spaceship Earth. Employees of the current sponsoring company and their guests can relax in the lounge while visiting Epcot. The sponsor can also hold receptions in the space as well as conduct workshops and business presentations. When Spaceship Earth was without sponsorship from 2004 to 2005, the room was utilized for private events such as weddings and conventions. The layout is small and curved in shape, with one wall consisting of large windows where visitors can look out onto the park.

When Siemens AG took over as sponsor, the lounge was given the name "Base21." In 2012, the name was dropped and it is now simply known as the "Siemens VIP Center." In August 2017, Siemens quickly left the lounge, and Disney took it over.

Timeline

October 1, 1982: Spaceship Earth opens with the opening of EPCOT Center, sponsored by the Bell System. The narrator is Vic Perrin.
May 26, 1986: Attraction reopens from first major renovation. AT&T is now the sponsor, having signed on in 1984. New narration by Walter Cronkite. Finale music changed to Tomorrow's Child.
August 15, 1994: Closes for second major renovation. "Home computer", "Office Computer", "Network Operations Center", and "Space Station" scenes removed. New final scenes installed and replace old final scenes. Earth Station closes. Tomorrow's Child ending removed.
November 23, 1994: Attraction reopens. New ride narration by Jeremy Irons. New ride score by Edo Guidotti. The Global Neighborhood replaces Earth Station.
September 29, 1999: The Mickey Mouse arm holding a wand is dedicated with "2000" over Spaceship Earth.
November 24, 1999: The Global Neighborhood is replaced with The New Global Neighborhood, a new exhibit space serving as a hands-on playground for Spaceship Earth's post show.
May 2001: The Mickey Mouse arm holding a wand is changed to say "Epcot" over Spaceship Earth.
January 1, 2004: AT&T Corporation sponsorship ends.
April 2004: The New Global Neighborhood is removed and the area is boarded up. AT&T references removed.
November 2005: It is announced that Siemens AG will sponsor Spaceship Earth for twelve years.
April 11, 2007: Major changes coming to Spaceship Earth are announced.
April 25, 2007: The new exhibit space in Spaceship Earth's post show called Project Tomorrow: Inventing the Wonders of the Future opens.
July 5, 2007: Epcot Vice President Jim Macphee announces the removal of the wand structure in time for the park's 25th anniversary on October 1, 2007.
July 9, 2007: Closes for a fourth renovation. Removal of the wand structure begins.
August 24, 2007: Removal of the wand structure completed.
December 2007: Guest previews of fourth edition begin.
February 15, 2008: Fourth edition opens to the general public. New narration by Dame Judi Dench.
March 4, 2008: Spaceship Earth is rededicated.
October 1, 2012: Spaceship Earth and Epcot celebrate their 30th anniversary.
June 30, 2017: Siemens announces the end of their Disney sponsorships, including Spaceship Earth.
October 1, 2017: Spaceship Earth and Epcot celebrate their 35th anniversary.
October 10, 2017: Official last day of the Siemens sponsorship.
June 20, 2020: Large-scale refurbishment postponed indefinitely.
October 1, 2022: Spaceship Earth and Epcot celebrate their 40th anniversary, which is part of Walt Disney World's 50th Anniversary celebration.

Narrators
Vic Perrin: October 1, 1982 – May 25, 1986
Walter Cronkite: May 29, 1986 – August 15, 1994
Jeremy Irons: November 23, 1994 – July 9, 2007
Judi Dench: February 15, 2008 – present

See also
Epcot attraction and entertainment history

References

Further reading

External links

Walt Disney World Resort - Spaceship Earth
Intercot's Spaceship Earth page
AT&T Archive video of the opening of Spaceship Earth

1982 establishments in Florida
Amusement rides introduced in 1982
Audio-Animatronic attractions
Dark rides
Epcot
Future World (Epcot)
World Celebration
Geodesic domes
Omnimover attractions
Ray Bradbury
Walt Disney Parks and Resorts attractions
Walt Disney Parks and Resorts icons
Siemens